Sternitta parasuffuscalis is a moth of the family Erebidae first described by Michael Fibiger in 2011. It is found in southern India (it was described from Thalassery).

Description
The wingspan is about 11 mm. The forewings are unicolorous dark grey. The crosslines are black. The hindwing ground colour is grey and the abdomen is light grey.

References

Micronoctuini
Taxa named by Michael Fibiger
Moths described in 2011